Rhynchocyclus is a genus of tyrant flycatchers. Established by Jean Cabanis in 1836.

Species
It contains four species:

The name Rhynchocyclus is a combination of the Greek words rhunkhos, meaning "bill" and kuklos, meaning "circle" or "shield".

References

 
Bird genera